Albert Baertsoen (9 January 1866 – 9 June 1922) was a Belgian painter, pastellist and graphic artist.

Life and work 
He was born in Ghent. His father was an industrialist and textile manufacturer. In 1882, he began attending the Royal Academy of Fine Arts, where he studied under Gustave Den Duyts and Jean Delvin. His debut as a painter came in 1887, when he participated in an exhibition in Brussels held by the secessionist group l'Essor.

He continued his studies in Paris, at the art school of Alfred Philippe Roll, and exhibited at the Salon in 1889. The following year, he accompanied James Ensor, Frantz Charlet and other Belgian painters on a study trip to London. In 1894, he helped found the "Cercle des Beaux-Arts d'Ostende". The years 1894/95 saw another stay in Paris, where his painting "Oude Vlaamse Vaart" (Old Flemish Sails) was acquired by the Musée du Luxembourg and he participated in an exhibition held by La Libre Esthétique. From 1896 to 1901, he continued to exhibit throughout Europe, winning several Gold Medals.

In 1913, he served as a member of the art jury for the Ghent World's Fair. During World War I, he lived in London, returning to Ghent in 1919. That same year, he was appointed a member of the Royal Academy of Belgium. Two years later, a retrospective of his work was held at the Galerie Georges Giroux in Brussels. He died in Ghent in 1922.

Honours 
 1919 : Commander of the Order of the Crown.
 1919: Member of the Royal Academie.

Writings 
 "De la mémoire visuelle chez l'artiste", in the Bulletin de l'Académie Royale de Belgique, Classe des Beaux-Arts, nrs. 9-10, Brussels, 1920

References

Further reading 
 Hippolyte Fierens-Gevaert, Albert Baertsoen, Elibron Classics (2001). Reprint of 1910 edition (French). 
 O. Roelandts, Albert Baertsoen, Royal Academy of Fine Arts (Ghent), 1928
 H. Van de Woestijne-Vanagt, De Visuele oprechtheid van Albert Baertsoen (retrospective catalog), 1972
 Paul Lambotte, Albert Baertsoen, in La revue de l'art ancien et moderne, Paris, 10 November 1919,

External links 

 ArtNet: More works by Baertsoen
 Albert Baertsoen | Online catalogue raisonné
 "A painter of dead cities: M. Albert Baertsoen", Gabriel Mourey, in The International Studio, Vol.5, @ Google Books
 "Recent Etchings by Albert Baertsoen" in The International Studio, Vol.30, @ Google Books

1866 births
1922 deaths
Artists from Ghent
19th-century Belgian painters
19th-century Belgian male artists
20th-century Belgian painters
Commanders of the Order of the Crown (Belgium)
Members of the Royal Academy of Belgium
Royal Academy of Fine Arts (Ghent) alumni
20th-century Belgian male artists